Clive Robin Sarstedt (21 January 1944 – 22 January 2022), who also recorded as Clive Sands, Wes Sands, and Robin Sarstedt, was a British pop singer and instrumentalist active from the late 1950s.  He was best known for his UK hit "My Resistance Is Low", a version of a song written and originally recorded by Hoagy Carmichael. He was the younger brother of singers Eden Kane and Peter Sarstedt.

Early life 
Sarstedt was born in Ajmer, Ajmer-Merwara Province, British India, now in Rajasthan, to parents who were British civil servants in what was then the British Raj in modern India. He was the youngest brother of Peter Sarstedt and Richard Sarstedt (billed as "Eden Kane") and recorded and played guitar on Sarstedt Brothers recordings.

Siblings
Clive Sarstedt's brothers were:

Eden Kane (born; Richard Graham Sarstedt, 29 March 1940, in New Delhi, British India) a teen idol, who topped the UK Singles Chart in 1961, with "Well I Ask You".

Peter Sarstedt (born Peter Eardley Sarstedt, 10 December 1941 Delhi, British India; died 8 January 2017 Sussex, England) best known for writing and performing the single "Where Do You Go To (My Lovely)?", which topped the UK Singles Chart in 1969.

Career
Sarstedt appeared on many live music shows including Top of The Pops. He initially recorded under the names "Wes Sands" (recorded by his manager, Joe Meek) and "Clive Sands". He joined The Deejays in Sweden in 1966 and 1967. They had two big hits on "Tio i Topp" in Sweden: "Dum Dum (Marble Breaks And Iron Bends)" and "Baby Talk". He finally had a hit in 1976, with a cover version of the Hoagy Carmichael penned song, "My Resistance Is Low", using his middle name and billed as Robin Sarstedt. It reached Number 3 in the UK Singles Chart.

Without other chart success, he remained a British one-hit wonder. However, in the Benelux countries he hit the charts later in 1976 with his version of "Let's Fall in Love", a song written by Harold Arlen and Ted Koehler and published in 1933, thus prolonging his short chart career there.

Later life and death
From the late 1990s Sarstedt lived in the Almería area of Spain.

Sarstedt died from a heart attack on 22 January 2022, at the age of 78.

Album discography
Clive Sarstedt – 1970 – RCA Records
Freeway Getaway – 1971 – RCA
In a Dream – 1971 – RCA

See also
List of performers on Top of the Pops
One-hit wonders in the UK

References

External links
Information on musical activity from 1996 onwards

1944 births
2022 deaths
English male singers
English pop singers
People from Ajmer